Emoticons is a Unicode block containing emoticons or emoji. 
Most of them are intended as representations of faces, although some of them include hand gestures or non-human characters (a horned "imp", monkeys, cartoon cats).

The block was first proposed in 2008, and first implemented in Unicode version 6.0 (2010). The reason for its adoption was largely for compatibility with a de facto standard that had been established by the early 2000s by Japanese telephone carriers, encoded in unused ranges with lead bytes 0xF5 to 0xF9 of the Shift JIS standard. KDDI has gone much further than this, and has introduced hundreds more in the space with lead bytes 0xF3 and 0xF4.

Descriptions

Chart

Variant forms
Each emoticon has two variants:
 U+FE0E (VARIATION SELECTOR-15) selects text presentation (e.g. 😊︎ 😐︎ ☹︎),
 U+FE0F (VARIATION SELECTOR-16) selects emoji-style (e.g. 😊️ 😐️ ☹️).
If there is no variation selector appended, the default is the emoji-style. Example:

Emoji modifiers

The Miscellaneous Symbols and Pictographs block has 54 emoji that represent people or body parts.
A set of "Emoji modifiers" are defined for emojis that represent people or body parts. These are modifier characters intended to define the skin colour to be used for the emoji.
The draft document suggesting the introduction of this system for the representation of "human diversity" was submitted in 2015 by Mark Davis of Google and Peter Edberg of Apple Inc.
Five symbol modifier characters were added with Unicode 8.0 to provide a range of skin tones for human emoji. They are based on the Fitzpatrick scale for classifying human skin color.

Additional human emoji can be found in other Unicode blocks: Dingbats, Miscellaneous Symbols, Miscellaneous Symbols and Pictographs, Supplemental Symbols and Pictographs, Symbols and Pictographs Extended-A and Transport and Map Symbols.

History
The following Unicode-related documents record the purpose and process of defining specific characters in the Emoticons block:

See also 
 Some basic smiley faces (☹, ☺, ☻) are in Miscellaneous Symbols block
 Additional smiley faces (e.g. 🤐, 🤑, etc) are in Supplemental Symbols and Pictographs block
 Some heads and figures (e.g. 👦; 🛀; etc) are in Miscellaneous Symbols and Pictographs and Transport and Map Symbols blocks
 Some body parts (e.g. ✌️; ⛹; etc) are in the Dingbat and Miscellaneous Symbols blocks

References 

Unicode blocks
Emoticons
Emoji